New York's 57th State Senate district is one of 63 districts in the New York State Senate. It has been represented by Republican George Borrello since a 2019 special election prompted by the resignation of fellow Republican Catharine Young.

Geography
District 57 is located in the far southwestern corner of Upstate New York, including all of Allegany, Cattaraugus, and Chautauqua Counties, as well as parts of Livingston County.

The district overlaps with New York's 23rd and 24th congressional districts, and with the 133rd, 148th, and 150th districts of the New York State Assembly.

Recent election results

2020

2019 special election

2018

2016

2014

2012

Federal results in District 57

References

57